The Gayang Bridge crosses the Han River in South Korea and connects the Gangseo District and Mapo District. The bridge was completed in 2002.

References

Bridges in Seoul
Buildings and structures in Gangseo District, Seoul
Buildings and structures in Mapo District
Bridges completed in 2002
2002 establishments in South Korea